The right gastric artery usually arises from the proper hepatic artery. It descends to the pyloric end of the stomach before passing from right to left along its lesser curvature, supplying it with branches, and finally anastomosing with the left gastric artery.

Anatomy

Variation 
Origin

In most (53%) individuals, the RGA arises from the proper hepatic artery. It can also arise from the region of division of the common hepatic artery (20%), the left branch of the hepatic artery (15%), the gastroduodenal artery (8%), and - most rarely - the common hepatic artery itself (4%).

Additional images

References

External links
  - "Stomach, Spleen and Liver: The Right and Left Gastric Artery"
 
 
 

Arteries of the abdomen
Stomach